David Beers is a Canadian journalist. He was born in 1957 and grew up in San Jose, California, where his father worked for Lockheed as a satellite test engineer. He attended Santa Clara University in Santa Clara, California.  He was the former editor of Mother Jones Magazine. He is a faculty member in the Graduate School of Journalism at the University of British Columbia.

Life
Over the past two decades, Beers’ work has been published in magazines including the Los Angeles Times Magazine and Harper's. In 1994, "We’re No Angels" was a finalist for the Canadian National Magazine Award.

In 2003, after being fired from the Vancouver Sun over a controversial editorial about freedom of speech in a post-9/11 milieu, Beers started an online publication in Vancouver, British Columbia called The Tyee. Funded in large part by non-profit groups, the British Columbia Federation of Labour and an advertising agency called Quest Advertising, the Tyee's goal is to publish news and opinion not adequately covered by the mainstream news media.
His book, Blue Sky Dream: A Memoir of America's Fall from Grace, is based on his essay, "The Crash of Blue Sky California", which won the American National Magazine Awards when it appeared in Harper's.

Works
 "The Public Sphere and Online, Independent Journalism", CSSE
"It's all good: The appeal of Deepak Chopra", Salon,  May 10, 2001
 Blue Sky Dream: A Memoir of America's Fall from Grace, 1996,

References

External links
The Tyee

Journalists from British Columbia
Writers from San Jose, California
Writers from Vancouver
1957 births
Living people